This is a list of songs written partly or entirely based on a film.

Films
 "2HB" by Roxy Music, a tribute to Humphrey Bogart and his character in Casablanca
 "9 to 5" by Dolly Parton about Nine to Five
 "Alfie" from the film of the same name, written by Burt Bacharach and Hal David
 "Alice" by Avril Lavigne about Alice in Wonderland
"The American Nightmare" by Ice Nine Kills about A Nightmare on Elm Street
 "American Werewolves In London" by Wednesday 13 about An American Werewolf In London
 "Agter Elke Man" by Steve Hofmeyr about Agter Elke Man (TV series and film)
 "Back in Time" by Pitbull about Men In Black 3
 "Bad Education" by Tilly and the Wall about Bad Education
 "Bat Country" by Avenged Sevenfold about Fear and Loathing in Las Vegas
 "Bonnie En Clyde" by Jay and Lianie May about Bonnie and Clyde
 "The Best of Both Worlds" performed by Hannah Montana about Hannah Montana: The Movie
 "Bridge to Terabithia" by Steve Roslonek about Bridge to Terabithia
 "Bring It (Snakes on a Plane)" by Cobra Starship about Snakes on a Plane
 "Call of Home" by Gavin Dunne about The Hobbit: The Desolation of Smaug
 "Calvero" by The Pillows about Limelight
 "Carlotta Valdez" by Harvey Danger about Vertigo
 "Cat People (Putting Out Fire)" by David Bowie about Cat People
 "Camp Rock" by Demi Lovato & Joe Jonas and the rest of the Cast of Camp Rock
 "Chain Saw" by The Ramones about The Texas Chain Saw Massacre
 "A Change of Seasons" by Dream Theater about Dead Poets Society
 "Children of the Damned" by Iron Maiden about Village of the Damned
 "Cinderella Man" by Rush based on Mr. Deeds Goes to Town
 "Circle of Life" by Carmen Twillie and Lebo M. (film version); and by Elton John (commercial version) about The Lion King
 "The Clansman" by Iron Maiden based on Braveheart
 "The Crimson Ghost" by the Misfits about The Crimson Ghost
 "Dawn of the Dead" by Michale Graves about Dawn of the Dead
 "Day of the Dead" by the Misfits about Day of the Dead
 "Dead by Dawn" by Deicide based on The Evil Dead
 "Death of an Interior Decorator" by Death Cab for Cutie about Interiors
 "Debaser" by Pixies about Un Chien Andalou
 "Didn't I See This Movie?" from the musical Next to Normal about One Flew Over the Cuckoo's Nest
 "Die Hard" by Guyz Nite about the Die Hard films
 "DNA" by Gavin Dunne about Prometheus
 "Don't Cry for Me Argentina" by Madonna about Evita
 "Dream Warriors" by Dokken about A Nightmare on Elm Street 3: Dream Warriors
 "The Edge of Darkness" by Iron Maiden about Apocalypse Now
 "Early Sunsets Over Monroeville" by My Chemical Romance about Dawn of the Dead
"Enjoy Your Slay" by Ice Nine Kills about The Shining
 "Evil Dead" by Death about The Evil Dead
 "Fidelity" by Regina Spektor based on High Fidelity
 "Fitzcarraldo" by The Frames about Fitzcarraldo
 "Flash" and the entire album Flash Gordon by Queen about Flash Gordon
"Freak Flag" by Ice Nine Kills about The Devils Rejects
 "From Now On We Are Enemies" by Fall Out Boy about Amadeus
 "Ghost of Frankenstein" by the Misfits about The Ghost of Frankenstein
 "Ghostbusters" by Ray Parker Jr. about Ghostbusters
 "Gifts and Curses" by Yellowcard about Spider-Man 2
 "A Girl Like You" by The Smithereens about Say Anything...
 "Godzilla" by Blue Öyster Cult about Godzilla
 "The Goonies 'R' Good Enough" by Cyndi Lauper for and about The Goonies
"A Grave Mistake" by Ice Nine Kills about The Crow
 "Gump" by "Weird Al" Yankovic about Forrest Gump
 "Haddonfield" by Wednesday 13 about Halloween
 "He's Back (The Man Behind the Mask)" by Alice Cooper about Friday the 13th Part VI: Jason Lives
 "Heartlight" by Neil Diamond about E.T. the Extra-Terrestrial
 "Hello, Dolly!" by Barbra Streisand and Louis Armstrong about Hello, Dolly!
 "Hello McFly" by Relient K about Back to the Future
 "Hellraiser" by Motörhead about the Hellraiser film series
 "Hier kommt Alex" and the entire album Ein kleines bisschen Horrorschau by Die Toten Hosen about A Clockwork Orange
 "High School Musical" by the Cast of High School Musical about the High School Musical Trilogy
 "Home" by Breaking Benjamin about The Wonderful Wizard of Oz
 "How Can I Live" by Ill Niño about Freddy vs. Jason
 "How I Go" by Yellowcard about Big Fish
 "I Can Transform Ya" by Chris Brown, Lil Wayne & Swizz Beatz about the Transformers film series
 "I Want to be Sullivan" by The Pillows about Angels with Dirty Faces
 "I'm Alright" by Kenny Loggins for and about Caddyshack
 "Imitation of Life" by R.E.M. about Imitation of Life
 "Iris" by Goo Goo Dolls about City of Angels
"It is the End" by Ice Nine Kills about IT
"The Jig Is Up" by Ice Nine Kills about Saw
 "Johnny Guitar" for the film of the same name, music by Victor Young and lyrics by Peggy Lee
 "Jurassic Park" by "Weird Al" Yankovic about Jurassic Park
 "The Kelly Affair" by be your own PET about Beyond the Valley of the Dolls
 "Key Largo" by Bertie Higgins
 "Kids of the Future" by The Jonas Brothers
 "Kill Bill (킬빌)" by Brown Eyed Girls about Kill Bill
 "King Kong Song" by Abba about King Kong
 "Lady Marmalade" (cover) by Christina Aguilera, P!nk, Lil' Kim and Mýa about Moulin Rouge!
 "Laura Palmer" by Bastille about Twin Peaks as a tribute to Laura Palmer
 "Land of the Dead" by the Misfits about Land of the Dead
 "LCM" by Children 18:3 about The Bourne Identity (stands for "Last Chance, Marie")
 "Leon" by The Japanese House about Léon: The Professional as a tribute for Léon Montana
 "Lion" by Rebecca St. James about The Chronicles of Narnia: The Lion, The Witch and The Wardrobe
 "Lost Boys" by The 69 Eyes about The Lost Boys 
"Love Bites" by Ice Nine Kills about An American Werewolf In London
 "Man on the Edge" by Iron Maiden about Falling Down
 "Matilda" by Alt-J about Léon: The Professional as a tribute for Mathilda Lando
 "Meet Me in Montauk" by Circa Survive about Eternal Sunshine of the Spotless Mind
"Merry Axe-mas" by Ice Nine Kills about Silent Night, Deadly Night
 "More Than It Seems" by Kutless about The Chronicles of Narnia: The Lion, The Witch and The Wardrobe
 "Mrs. Robinson" by Simon & Garfunkel for and about The Graduate
 "My Heart Will Go On" by Celine Dion about Titanic
 "New Divide" by Linkin Park for Transformers: Revenge of the Fallen
 "A New Hope" by Blink-182 about Star Wars Episode IV: A New Hope
 "New York, New York" by Liza Minnelli (and later Frank Sinatra) about New York City for the film New York, New York
 "My Iron Skin" by Gavin Dunne for Iron Man 3
 "New World" by TobyMac about The Chronicles of Narnia: The Lion, The Witch and The Wardrobe
 "Night of the Living Dead" by the Misfits about Night of the Living Dead
 "Nosferatu" by Hugh Cornwell about Nosferatu, eine symphonie des grauens
 "Ode to a Superhero" by "Weird Al" Yankovic about Spider-Man
 "Of Wolf and Man" by Metallica about The Wolfen
 "One" by Metallica about Johnny Got His Gun
 "Open Up Your Eyes" by Jeremy Camp about The Chronicles of Narnia: The Lion, The Witch and The Wardrobe
 "Opening Night" by dEUS about John Cassavetes's Opening Night 
 "Ouch" by be your own PET about Dawn of the Dead
 "Out of the Silent Planet" by Iron Maiden about Forbidden Planet
 "Painting Flowers" by All Time Low about Alice in Wonderland
 "PATRICIA" by The Pillows about A Bout de Souffle
 "The Pirates Who Don't Do Anything" by Relient K for and about Jonah: A Veggie Tales Movie
 "Pocketful of Miracles" from the film of the same name, written by Jimmy Van Heusen and Sammy Cahn.  The song won the Academy Award for Best Original Song
 "Purple Rain" by Prince, based on Purple Rain
 "Rambo" by Frankenstein Drag Queens From Planet 13 about Rambo
 "Raped in Hatred by Vines of Thorn" by The Black Dahlia Murder about The Evil Dead
 "Real Cool World" by David Bowie for & about Cool World
 "Return of the Fly" by the Misfits about Return of the Fly
 "Rise" by Gavin Dunne for The Dark Knight Rises
 "Risky Business" by Van Dammes about Risky Business
"Rocking the Boat" by Ice Nine Kills about Jaws
 "The Saga Begins" by "Weird Al" Yankovic about Star Wars: Episode I – The Phantom Menace 
"Savages" by Ice Nine Kills about The Texas Chainsaw Massacre
 "See You Again" by Wiz Khalifa and Charlie Puth about The Fast and the Furious film series as a tribute to Paul Walker
 "Scarecrow" by The Pillows about Scarecrow
 "The Seventh Seal" by Scott Walker about The Seventh Seal
 "Shining" by the Misfits about Poltergeist
 "Skinny Blues" by The Pillows about The Lost Weekend
 "Sleeping Awake" by P.O.D. for and about The Matrix Reloaded
 "Smart Alex" by The Adicts about A Clockwork Orange
 "So Long, Astoria" by The Ataris about The Goonies
 "Spider-Man" by Michael Bublé about Spider-Man
"Stabbing in the Dark" by Ice Nine Kills about Halloween
 "Sweep the Leg" by Karate High School about Karate Kid
 "Sweep the Leg" by No More Kings about Karate Kid
 "Telephone" by Lady Gaga and Beyoncé about Kill Bill
"Thank God It's Friday" by Ice Nine Kills about Friday the 13th
 "These Boots Are Made for Walkin'" (cover) by Jessica Simpson about The Dukes of Hazzard
 "This is Home" by Switchfoot about The Chronicles of Narnia: Prince Caspian
 "Three Coins in the Fountain" from the film of the same name, written by Jule Styne, lyrics by Sammy Cahn
 "Thunderball" by Johnny Cash for and about Thunderball; the song was rejected and not used in the film
 "Til Death Do Us Party" by Wednesday 13 about Friday the 13th
 "Twilight of the Dead" by the Misfits about Land of the Dead
 "The Union Forever" by The White Stripes about Citizen Kane
 "Vengeance (The Pact)" by Blue Öyster Cult is about the "Taarna" vignette in Heavy Metal
 "Weird Science (song)" by Oingo Boingo is about Weird Science
 "Welcome Home (Sanitarium)" by Metallica is based on One Flew Over the Cuckoo's Nest
 "What I've Done" by Linkin Park about Transformers
 "When Two Worlds Collide" by Iron Maiden is based on When Worlds Collide
 "Where Eagles Dare" by Iron Maiden about Where Eagles Dare
 "Who Made Who" by AC/DC about Maximum Overdrive
 "Wind It Up" by Gwen Stefani about The Sound of Music
 "The Wicker Man" by Iron Maiden about The Wicker Man
"The World in My Hands" by Ice Nine Kills about Edward Scissorhands
 "Year 3000" by Busted about the Back to the Future Trilogy
 "Yoda" by "Weird Al" Yankovic about The Empire Strikes Back 
 "You Know My Name" by Chris Cornell about the James Bond series
 "Youngster (Kent Arrow)" by The Pillows about Quadrophenia
"Your Number's Up" by Ice Nine Kills about Scream
"The Cabinet" by Das Kabinette about The Cabinet of Dr. Caligari
"Kirsten Supine" by Swans about Melancholia, specifically the scene where Kirsten Dunst lies nude in the moonlight
"Attack Ships on Fire" by Revolting Cocks about the Blade Runner scene of Roy Batty's dying monologue
"Only" by Nine Inch Nails, about Fight Club

See also
List of songs that retell a work of literature

Film
Songs